Derek Ainslie Jackson, OBE, DFC, AFC, FRS (23 June 1906 – 20 February 1982) was a spectroscopist and also a jockey. Derek Jackson was one of the outstanding atomic physicists of his generation.

Biography
Son of a wealthy Welshman, Sir Charles Jackson, who was both a leading authority on antique silver and chairman of the News of the World, Jackson showed early promise in the field of spectroscopy under the guidance of Professor Lindemann, making the first quantitative determination of a nuclear magnetic spin using atomic spectroscopy to measure the hyperfine structure of caesium.

His scientific research at Oxford did not, however, interfere with his other great passion – steeplechase riding – which led him from the foxhunting field to his first ride in the Grand National of 1935.  A keen huntsman, he took up the sport again after the war, riding in two more Nationals after the war, the last time when he was 40 years old.

In World War II, Jackson distinguished himself in the RAF, making an important scientific contribution to Britain's air defences and to the bomber offensive. He flew more than a thousand hours as a navigator, many of them in combat in night-fighters, with No. 604 (County of Middlesex) Squadron based at RAF Middle Wallop. He was decorated with the DFC, AFC and OBE.
This war record stands in contrast to his stated desire at the war's inception to keep Britain out of fighting Germany, and his reported desire "that all Jews in England should be killed".

For the rest of his life, Jackson, appointed a Fellow of the Royal Society in 1947, lived as a tax exile in Ireland, France and Switzerland. He continued his spectroscopic work in France at the Centre national de la recherche scientifique, and was made a chevalier de la Légion d'honneur.

Jackson had what might be called a colourful personal life. A "rampant bisexual", he was married six times, and also lived for three years with Angela Culme-Seymour, the half-sister of Janetta Wooley, one of his wives. The others included a daughter of Augustus John, Pamela Mitford (one of the Mitford sisters), a princess and several femme fatales including Barbara Skelton (in whose obituary in the Independent is noted her remark that it was "not for love that (she) married Professor Jackson", he being identified as "the millionaire son of the founder of the News of the World").

Books and publications

References

Secondary sources

Alumni of Trinity College, Cambridge
Bisexual men
Chevaliers of the Légion d'honneur
Fellows of the Royal Society
English bisexual people
Officers of the Order of the British Empire
Recipients of the Air Force Cross (United Kingdom)
Recipients of the Distinguished Flying Cross (United Kingdom)
Royal Air Force personnel of World War II
Spectroscopists
1906 births
1982 deaths
20th-century English LGBT people
Fellows of the American Physical Society